Don't Play That Song! is the third studio album by Ben E. King. The album was released by Atlantic Records as an LP in 1962 and was home to five notable singles: "Stand by Me", "Ecstasy", "First Taste of Love", "Here Comes the Night", and the title track, "Don't Play That Song (You Lied)".

Track listing
"Don't Play That Song (You Lied)" (Ahmet Ertegün, Betty Nelson) – 2:46
"Ecstasy" (Doc Pomus, Phil Spector) – 2:32
"On the Horizon" (Jerry Leiber, Mike Stoller) – 2:18
"Show Me the Way" (Gerry Goffin, Carole King) – 2:18
"Here Comes the Night" (Doc Pomus, Mort Shuman) – 2:24
"First Taste of Love" (Doc Pomus, Mort Shuman) – 2:20
"Stand by Me" (Ben E. King, Jerry Leiber, Mike Stoller) – 2:57
"Yes" (Jerry Leiber, Mike Stoller) – 3:03
"Young Boy Blues" (Doc Pomus, Phil Spector) – 2:17
"The Hermit of Misty Mountain" (Ruth Batchelor, Bob Roberts) – 2:20
"I Promise Love" (Ben E. King, Lover Patterson) – 2:05
"Brace Yourself" (Otis Blackwell) – 2:08

Personnel
Stan Applebaum - arrangements
Jimmie Haskell - arrangement on "Don't Play That Song (You Lied)" 
Claus Ogerman - arrangement on "The Hermit of Misty Mountain" 
Technical
Loring Eutemey - cover design
Maurice Seymour - cover photography

Charts

References

1962 albums
Ben E. King albums
Albums arranged by Jimmie Haskell
Albums arranged by Claus Ogerman
Albums produced by Ahmet Ertegun
Albums produced by Jerry Leiber
Albums produced by Mike Stoller
Atco Records albums